Bissli (Bisli) is an Israeli wheat snack  produced by Osem. Bissli is Osem's second-best selling snack brand after Bamba.

Bissli is a crunchy snack that is made in the shape of pasta. The name is a combination of the Hebrew word Bis, meaning "bite", and the Hebrew word li, meaning "for me".

The most popular flavors are "Grill" and "Barbecue". Other flavors include onion, smoky, pizza, falafel and Mexican.

Described by the manufacturer as a uniquely Israeli product, Bissli is produced in five factories around Israel. It was first sold in 1975.

In 2014, Osem introduced a special edition of their other popular snack, peanut-flavor Bamba together with Bissli, mixed within the same blue package, named "Bissli-Bamba Mix" , another edition of "Mix" included onion-flavor Bissli, packaged in a green pack.

Gallery

See also
 Israeli cuisine
 Snack food

References

Brand name snack foods
Israeli cuisine
Israeli brands